Sticker is a Live action short film directed by Georgi M. Unkovski in 2019.

In 2020, it was premiered at Sundance Film Festival and won the Best Narrative Short Prize at Brooklyn Film Festival. Moreover, it was amongst the nominees at Palm Springs International ShortFest.

Sticker was produced by Ivan Unkovski (Cinema Futura) and distributed worldwide by the International Production & Distribution company Salaud Morisset.

Plot 
Dejan, a young father, only wants to make it on time to her daughter's school play. But the entire Macedonian administration/bureaucracy seems to have decided otherwise.

Awards 
Since its launch, the film has been selected in more than 150 festivals around the world.

References

External links 

Sticker on IMDB
Sticker (Full Film) on Vimeo
Salaud Morisset, Short Films Production & Distribution

2019 films
Macedonian drama films